Egomaniacs is a studio album by Kim Fahy, Jamie Harley and Kramer, released in 1993 by Shimmy Disc.

Track listing

Personnel 
Adapted from Egomaniacs liner notes.

Musicians
 Kim Fahy – vocals, guitar
 Jamie Harley – drums, percussion, engineering
 Kramer – vocals, bass guitar, Hammond organ, production, mixing

Production and additional personnel
 DAM – design
 Michael Macioce – photography
 Ron Paul – assistant engineer

Release history

References

External links 
 

1993 albums
Collaborative albums
Albums produced by Kramer (musician)
Kramer (musician) albums
Shimmy Disc albums